is the name of a group of shield volcanoes located on the coast of Japan on the southwest end of the island of Honshū. It is primarily based in the city of Hagi, Yamaguchi Prefecture.

The group dates from 800,000 years ago and was active into the Holocene era. The last eruption occurred around 9000 years ago.

The group of volcanoes consists of basalt and dacitic lava flows, small shield volcanoes, cinder cones, and lava domes. Altogether, there are about 40 volcanoes, with the highest peak being Irao-yama.

Volcanic activity in the region i related to subduction of the Philippine Sea Plate.

The erupted magmas of Abu are mainly alkaline basalt and calc-alkaline andesite - dacite in composition.

See also
 List of volcanoes in Japan
 List of mountains in Japan

References

External links 
 Abu Volcanoes - Japan Meteorological Agency 
  - Japan Meteorological Agency
 Abu - Smithsonian Institution: Global Volcanism Program

Volcanoes of Honshū
Volcanic fields
Volcanoes of Yamaguchi Prefecture